Giovanni de Torrecilla y Cárdenas (2 April 1623 – 24 June 1688) was a Roman Catholic prelate who served as Archbishop of Brindisi (1681–1688) and Bishop of L'Aquila (1676–1681).

Biography
Giovanni de Torrecilla y Cárdenas was born in Almería, Spain on 2 April 1623. On 10 November 1675, he was selected as Bishop of L'Aquila and confirmed by Pope Innocent XI on 19 October 1676. On 28 October 1676, he was consecrated bishop by Pietro Francesco Orsini de Gravina, Archbishop of Manfredonia, with Angelo della Noca, Archbishop Emeritus of Rossano, and Prospero Bottini, Titular Archbishop of Myra, serving as co-consecrators. On 17 March 1681, he was appointed during the papacy of Pope Innocent XI as Archbishop of Brindisi. He served as Archbishop of Brindisi until his death on 24 June 1688.

References

External links and additional sources
 (for Chronology of Bishops)
 (for Chronology of Bishops)
 (for Chronology of Bishops)
 (for Chronology of Bishops)

17th-century Italian Roman Catholic archbishops
Bishops appointed by Pope Innocent XI
1623 births
1688 deaths
People from Almería